Sarina may refer to Sarina, Queensland

Sarina, Queensland
 Sarina Beach, Queensland
 Sarina Range, Queensland
 Shire of Sarina
 Sarina War Memorial
 Sarina railway station
 Sarina State High School

Other
 Sarina (name)
 Sarina Paris (album)
 Nalani & Sarina